Hutton Township is one of twelve townships in Coles County, Illinois, USA.  As of the 2010 census, its population was 919 and it contained 371 housing units.

Geography

Cities, towns, villages
 Charleston (southeast edge)

Extinct towns
 Diona
 Hutton

Cemeteries
The township contains 18 cemeteries: Anderson, Beavers, Brandenburg, Coles County Poor Farm, Grant, Hurricane, Old Kelly, Liberty, McKenzie, Otterbein, Parker, Salisbury, Sargent, Stewart, Stringtown, Welch, Whetstone and Wiley Brick.

Major highways
  Illinois Route 130

Rivers
 Embarras River

Demographics

School districts
 Casey-Westfield Community Unit School District 4c
 Charleston Community Unit School District 1

Political districts
 Illinois' 15th congressional district
 State House District 110
 State Senate District 55

References
 
 United States Census Bureau 2007 TIGER/Line Shapefiles
 United States National Atlas

External links
 City-Data.com
 Illinois State Archives

Adjacent townships 

Townships in Coles County, Illinois
Townships in Illinois